The 2021 U Sports Men's Final 8 Basketball Tournament was scheduled to be held March 11–14, 2021 in Halifax, Nova Scotia. However, on October 15, 2020, it was announced that the championship was cancelled due to the COVID-19 pandemic.

It was scheduled to be hosted by St. Francis Xavier University, which would have been the second time that they had hosted the championship, with the other being held in 1968. Sports & Entertainment Atlantic (S|E|A) was a production partner for the event, which would have been their fourth year of coordinating the championship game. The tournament would have been held at the Scotiabank Centre for the fourth time in five years and it would have been the 33rd time that the tournament will be played in Halifax.

See also 
2021 U Sports Women's Basketball Championship

References 

2020–21 in Canadian basketball
2021 in Nova Scotia
St. Francis Xavier University
U Sports Men's Basketball Championship
U Sports Men's Basketball Championship